The 1993–94 Northern Counties East Football League season was the 12th in the history of Northern Counties East Football League, a football competition in England.

Premier Division

The Premier Division featured 18 clubs which competed in the previous season, along with two new clubs, promoted from Division One:
Hucknall Town
Lincoln United

League table

Division One

Division One featured 12 clubs which competed in the previous season, along with three new clubs.
Clubs joined from the Central Midlands League:
Arnold Town
Louth United
Plus:
Harrogate Railway Athletic, relegated from the Premier Division

League table

External links
 Northern Counties East Football League

1993–94
8